The Swift River is a  river in the White Mountains of New Hampshire in the United States. It is a tributary of the Saco River, which flows to the Atlantic Ocean in Maine.

The Swift River rises in the township of Livermore, New Hampshire, on the eastern side of Kancamagus Pass, and flows east into a broad valley, surrounded by mountains, known as the Albany Intervale. Leaving the intervale, the river enters a narrow gorge, passing over two sets of small waterfalls, and continues east through the town of Albany to the Saco River at Conway.

The river is paralleled for its entire length by New Hampshire Route 112, the scenic Kancamagus Highway.

See also

List of rivers of New Hampshire

References

External links
The Swift River - A Report to the General Court, 1990
The Swift River - NH Rivers Management and Protection Program
Swift River Corridor Management Plan, 1994

Saco River
Rivers of New Hampshire
Rivers of Carroll County, New Hampshire